North Fork Little Thompson River is a tributary of the Little Thompson River in Larimer County, Colorado.  It flows southeast from a source in Roosevelt National Forest to a confluence with the Little Thompson.

See also
List of rivers of Colorado

References

Rivers of Colorado
Rivers of Larimer County, Colorado
Tributaries of the Platte River